Simoné du Toit (born 27 September 1988) is a South African shot putter.

Her personal best throw is 17.13 metres, achieved in October 2005 in Naboomspruit. In the discus throw she has 53.07 metres, achieved in February 2006 in Roodepoort.

Achievements

Simone's all time furthest throws include the furthest throw for a 13-year-old in the world. 
World leading distance in Morocco at the World Youth Games 2006.
African Record in discus
Second best distance of all time in South African history in both events, shot put and discus.

Simone graduated from Southern Methodist University in Dallas, Texas December 2011.
She achieved as an NCAA athlete and collected several C- USA athlete of the week awards.
Simone was the recipient of the prestigious Student athlete of the year 2010 award for All sports at SMU.
  
She used to working at QuickBooks as the manager of HR and payroll. Nowadays she takes a more relaxing approach to life since being engaged to Henry Brown, a successful business man from Centurion, Pretoria.
Simone also coaches athletics at Hoerskool Kempton Park. Her athelic group consist of about 20 athletes from which there are several SA champions.

Simone has two sisters, Danell du Toit and Chane du Toit who both live in Kempton Park.
Danell du Toit, age 16,goes to the same highschool that her eldest sister went to in Kempton Park.

Simone's father, Boesman du Toit, an old Northern Transvaal and Transvaal rugby player was also her coach. 
He is married to Mariaan du Toit and they live in Kempton Park.

Mariaan and Boesman has an insurance company Y2k Finance situated in Kempton Park.

References

External links

1988 births
Living people
South African female shot putters
South African female discus throwers
Athletes (track and field) at the 2006 Commonwealth Games
Commonwealth Games competitors for South Africa
Afrikaner people
SMU Mustangs women's track and field athletes
Southern Methodist University alumni
African Games silver medalists for South Africa
African Games medalists in athletics (track and field)
Athletes (track and field) at the 2007 All-Africa Games